Worlock is a single by the band Skinny Puppy from the album Rabies. The song uses a sample of the guitars in "Helter Skelter" by The Beatles, as well as a vocal sample of Charles Manson singing the song. Vocalist Nivek Ogre considered it one of the band's better songs.

A mispressed CD release exists that contained Sinéad O'Connor's "The Emperor's New Clothes."

Music video
A video was created for this song that, in part, consisted of many graphic scenes from films, largely of the horror and giallo genres.  The films used include: Four Flies on Grey Velvet, Deep Red, Suspiria, Dario Argento's World of Horror, Tenebrae, Combat Shock, Demons, Phenomena, Opera, The Beyond, Hellraiser, Hellbound: Hellraiser II, Bad Taste, Dead & Buried, Luther The Geek, Maniac Cop, Henry: Portrait of a Serial Killer, Phantasm II, From Beyond, Re-Animator, Parents, Death Warmed Up, Hidden Crimes, Intruder, Dune, Eraserhead, and Altered States.

The X-rated version opens with a transmission sound from Videodrome.

Track listing

Personnel
All credits adapted from liner notes.

Skinny Puppy
Nivek Ogre – vocals
cEvin Key – synthesizers, programming, engineering, production
Dwayne Goettel – synthesizers, programming, engineering, production, editing

Additional personnel
Dave Ogilvie – production, editing
Marc Ramaer – mixing (2, 3)
Steven R. Gilmore – artwork

References

1990 singles
Skinny Puppy songs
Nettwerk Records singles
Capitol Records singles
1989 songs
Songs written by cEvin Key
Songs written by Nivek Ogre
Songs written by Dwayne Goettel